Clifford George Huxford (8 June 1937 – 3 August 2018) was an English footballer who played as a wing half in the Football League for Chelsea, Southampton and Exeter City.

Football career 
Huxford began his career as a junior with Chelsea, and made his Football League debut for the club in the 1958–59 season, before moving to Southampton in part-exchange for Charlie Livesey. He spent eight seasons with Southampton, during which he played 320 games in all competitions, scoring 4 goals. In 1967, he moved on to Exeter City for a season, playing a further 41 games and scoring once. He went on to play for clubs including Worcester City of the Southern League, after which he had a long career as coach or manager with numerous clubs in non-League football.

References

External links
 

1937 births
2018 deaths
People from Stroud
English footballers
Association football midfielders
Chelsea F.C. players
Southampton F.C. players
Exeter City F.C. players
Worcester City F.C. players
English Football League players
Southern Football League players
English football managers
Aldershot F.C. managers
Brockenhurst F.C. managers
Sportspeople from Gloucestershire
Outfield association footballers who played in goal